Chrysidea is a genus of cuckoo wasps (insect belonging to the family Chrysididae).

Taxonomy
Chrysidea and Trichrysis are closely related and probably they should be considered the same genus. For example, some authors consider the species Chrysidea pumila as a synonym of Trichrysis pumilionis Linsenmaier, 1987.

This genus includes small species, from 3 to 6 mm, with variable colors ranging from green and blue-green to blue.

Species
 Chrysidea asensioi  (Mingo, 1985) 
 Chrysidea persica  (Radoszkowski, 1881) 
 Chrysidea pumila  (Klug 1845)  (type species)

References 

Chrysidinae
Hymenoptera genera